Kahama Rural District is one of the five districts of the Shinyanga Region of Tanzania. Its administrative centre is the town of Kahama. The district consists of two separate parts, divided by Kahama Urban District. The area to the northeast is Msalala District, while the part to the southwest is Ushetu Council.

According to the 2012 Tanzania National Census, the population of the Kahama Rural District was 523,802.

Transport
Paved Trunk road T3 from Morogoro to the Rwanda border passes through Kahama Rural District from east to west.

There is a train station and a dry port at the town of Isaka, on the stretch of Mwanza railway line going from Tabora to Shinyanga.

Wards
As of 2012, Kahama Rural District was administratively divided into 35 wards.

 Bugarama
 Bukomela
 Bulige
 Bulungwa
 Bulyanhulu
Busangi
 Chambo
 Chela
 Chona
 Idahina
 Igunda
 Igwamanoni
 Isaka
 Jana
 Kashishi
 Kinamapula
 Kisuke
 Lunguya
 Mapamba
 Mega
 Mpunze
 Mwalugulu
 Mwanase
 Ngaya
 Ntobo
 Nyankende
 Sabasabini
 Segese
 Shilela
 Ubagwe
 Ukune
 Ulewe
 Ulowa
 Ushetu
 Uyogo

References

Districts of Shinyanga Region